Spånga Church is a church in the Spånga-Tensta borough in Stockholm, Sweden. The oldest part of the church origins from the time period 1175 – 1200. Large reconstructions and enhancements took place during the 14th century and the 15th century.

Baron Gustaf Bonde (1620–1667), owner of the nearby Hässelby castle, made considerable donations to the church. After his death a grave choir, drawn by the architect Nicodemus Tessin the Elder, was attached as a continuation of the church, in which he and his descendants are buried. The church also contains other historical monuments, such as several fresco paintings from the Middle Ages. The church was latest renovated 1953–1955.

Paintings
The first church paintings are probably from the 14th century, when the long nave was built. These were mostly abstract decorations, geometrical patterns and ornaments. Paintings from the early 15th century are interpreted as biblical motives from the Old Testament, the prophets Elijah and Elisha, but with landscape, houses, clothing and tools common at the time of painting. The name(s) of the painter(s) from this period are not known. In the late 15th century the triumphal arch was set up, as well as a new choir, and paintings from this period are of a different style, with motives from both the Old and New Testament, as well as later Saints.

During a church restoration in 1789 all paintings were overpainted with white. The interior walls remained white until a new restoration around 1900 was made. This restoration was quite rough, and the walls were repainted. In the 1950s the walls went through a new restoration, which aimed to bring forward some of the original medieval paintings that had been covered 160 years earlier.

Runestone
Three Viking Age runestones stand outside the church. There are also several fragments of runestones inside the church. One of the runestones is designated as U 61 in Rundata and is made of granite. On one side the stone has a runic inscription within bands with an interior Christian cross design, and on the other side it has a second cross. It is classified as being carved in runestone style RAK, which is the oldest style. This classification is used for those inscriptions where the runic text band ends are straight and do not have any attached serpent or animal heads. The runic inscription for stylistic reasons has been attributed to a runemaster named Gunnar. Other runestones are also attributed to this runemaster and he signed the runic inscription U 226 at Arkils tingstad.

Of the personal names mentioned in the inscription, Þorbiorn or Þorbjôrn means "Thor's Bear," Gunnbiorn or Gunnbjôrn means "Battle Bear," Halfdan means "Half Dane," Ulf or Ulfr means "Wolf," and Biorn or Bjôrn means "Bear."

Inscription
A transliteration of the runic inscription to roman letters is:
hialmuiþ(r) : auk : þurbiarn : kunbiarn : auk : halftan : þais : raistu : stin : þina : eftiʀ : bruþur : sin : ulf : auk : faþur : sen biarn : auk : bruþur : sen : blakari

A transcription into Old Norse is:
hialmuiþ auk þurbiarn kunbiarn auk halftan þais raistu stin þina eftir bruþur sin ulf auk faþur sen biarn auk bruþur sen blakari

A translation into English is:
Hialmviðr and Þorbiorn, Gunnbiorn and Halfdan raised this stone after (in memory of) their brother Ulf and their father Biorn and their brother Blakare.

Notable events
In 1901, Spånga kyrka was one of two churches designated control points for the first public orienteering competition ever held in Sweden.
On August 26, 1974, Arne Domnerus, playing saxophone, and Gustav Sjokvist, playing organ, recorded their highly-acclaimed album, Antiphone Blues, in this church.

See also 
 List of churches in Stockholm

References

External links
Photograph of runestone U 61
Photograph of runestone U 61 reverse side

Churches in Stockholm
Churches in the Diocese of Stockholm (Church of Sweden)
Churches converted from the Roman Catholic Church to the Church of Sweden
Runestones in Uppland
12th-century churches in Sweden
Church frescos in Sweden